Nerita planospira is a species of sea snail, a marine gastropod mollusk in the family Neritidae.

Description
The shell is cream and mottled black in color with an inner surface of the flat-spired nerite smooth and white. It has a toothed shelf protecting the entrance.  The outer surface is thick and roughly ridged, and tightly coiled.

Distribution
This marine species occurs off Papua New Guinea

References

 Hombron J.B. & Jacquinot H. (1848 [November]). Atlas d'Histoire Naturelle. Zoologie par MM. Hombron et Jacquinot, chirurgiens de l'expédition. in: Voyage au Pôle Sud et dans l'Océanie sur les corvettes l'Astrolabe et la Zélée pendant les années 1837-1838-1839-1840 sous le commandement de M. Dumont-D'Urville capitaine de vaisseau publié sous les auspices du département de la marine et sous la direction supérieure de M. Jacquinot, capitaine de Vaisseau, commandant de La Zélée. Vingt-cinquiéme livraison. Mollusques pls 14, 16, 19, 22; Insectes lépidoptéres pl. 3.
 Liu, J.Y. [Ruiyu] (ed.). (2008). Checklist of marine biota of China seas. China Science Press. 1267 pp.

External links
 Anton, H. E. (1838). Verzeichniss der Conchylien welche sich in der Sammlung von Herrmann Eduard Anton befinden. Herausgegeben von dem Besitzer. Halle: Anton. xvi + 110 pp
 Récluz, C. A. (1841). Description de quelques nouvelles espèces de Nérites vivantes. Revue Zoologique, par la Société Cuvierienne. 1841(4): 102-109; 1841(5): 147-152; 1841(9): 273-278; 1841(10): 310-318; 1841(11): 337-343

Neritidae
Gastropods described in 1839